This article refers to the archaeologist. For others with the name Malcolm Rogers, please see Malcolm Rogers (disambiguation).

Malcolm Jennings Rogers (1890–1960) was a pioneering archaeologist in southern California, Baja California, and Arizona.

Born in Fulton, New York, Rogers studied mining geology at Syracuse University and initially worked as a mining geologist. After service in the U.S. Marine Corps during World War I, he moved to Escondido, California in 1919 and took up citrus farming. However, he was soon involved with local archaeology and associated with the San Diego Museum of Man. He moved to San Diego and became a full-time Curator at the museum in 1930, continuing at that post until his resignation in 1945. Health and other personal problems resulted in a hiatus in his archaeological work, which he resumed in 1958 as a research associate at the museum. He was working on his previous notes and collections in 1960 when a traffic accident caused his death (Ezell 1961; Pourade 1966; Hanna 1982, 2013).

Rogers' fieldwork included extensive survey and excavation work in the coastal zone of San Diego County and northwestern Baja California, as well as throughout the California deserts to the east and western Arizona (Apple 2013; Hedges 2013; Laylander and Bendímez 2013; Pigniolo 2013; Schaefer 2013; Schneider 2013). He identified and named the San Dieguito, La Jolla, Amargosa, and Yuman archaeological complexes (Rogers 1929a, 1929b, 1939, 1945, 1966; Warren 1966, 2013; Sutton 2013). He also produced one of the earliest ethnoarchaeological studies of pottery-making among the surviving native peoples of his region (Rogers 1936; Panich and Wilken-Robertson 2013).

Rogers' contributions were sometimes confusing to his successors, as in the case of his changing nomenclature for the San Dieguito complex and its constituent phases. Working primarily before the advent of radiocarbon dating, he adhered to a short chronology for regional prehistory that has subsequently been discarded. His published observations, manuscript notes, and collections on aboriginal ceramics were never worked into a full-blown typology, and later analysts have interpreted them with markedly different conclusions (Schroeder 1958; May 1978; Van Camp 1979; Waters 1982a, 1982b; Seymour 1997; Burton and Quinn 2013). One researcher noted that Rogers' reports "so often present his formulations without detailing the evidence on which they are founded" (Ezell 1961:533). Nonetheless, these formulations continue to be the starting point for most research in the region, and his observations of so much that has subsequently been lost from the archaeological record have become indispensable.

References
Apple, Rebecca. 2013. "Malcolm Rogers: Ancient Trails and Rock Features". Pacific Coast Archaeological Society Quarterly 48(3&4):89-95.
Burton, Margie M., and Patrick S. Quinn. 2013. "Malcolm J. Rogers on Archaeological Ceramics: Foundations and Current Studies in the San Diego Region". Pacific Coast Archaeological Society Quarterly 48(3&4):97-108.
Ezell, Paul. 1961. "Malcolm Jennings Rogers, 1890-1960". American Antiquity 26:532-534.
Hanna, David C., Jr. 1982. Malcolm J. Rogers: The Biography of a Paradigm. Masters thesis, Department of Anthropology, San Diego State University.
Hanna, David C., Jr. 2013. "Malcolm J. Rogers' Career and Context", Pacific Coast Archaeological Society Quarterly 48(3&4):7-12.
Hedges, Ken. 2013. "Malcolm Rogers and Rock Art Research in the Far Southwest". Pacific Coast Archaeological Society Quarterly 48(3&4):65-74.
Laylander, Don, and Julia Bendímez Patterson. 2013. Malcolm Rogers in Baja California. Pacific Coast Archaeological Society Quarterly 48(3&4):43-55.
May, Ronald V. 1978. "A Southern California Indigenous Ceramic Typology: A Contribution to Malcolm J. Rogers Research". Journal of the Archaeological Survey Association of Southern California 2(2).
Panich, Lee M., and Michael Wilken-Robertson. 2013. "Malcolm J. Rogers As an Ethnoarchaeologist: Reflections from Santa Catarina, Baja California". Pacific Coast Archaeological Society Quarterly 48(3&4):109-119.
Pigniolo, Andrew R. 2013. "Malcolm Rogers: Geoarchaeologist". Pacific Coast Archaeological Society Quarterly 48(3&4):75-87.
Pourade, Richard F. 1966. "Discovering the San Dieguito People". In Ancient Hunters of the Far West, by Malcolm J. Rogers, pp. 3–20. Union-Tribune Publishing, San Diego.
Rogers, Malcolm J. 1929a. "The Stone Art of the San Dieguito Plateau". American Anthropologist 31:454-467.
Rogers, Malcolm J. 1929b. Report of an Archaeological Reconnaissance in the Mohave Sink Region. San Diego Museum Papers No. 1.
Rogers, Malcolm J. 1936. Yuman Pottery Making. San Diego Museum Papers No. 2.
Rogers, Malcolm J. 1939. Early Lithic Industries of the Lower Basin of the Colorado River and Adjacent Desert Areas. San Diego Museum Papers No. 3.
Rogers, Malcolm J. 1945. "An Outline of Yuman Prehistory". Southwestern Journal of Anthropology 1:167-198.
Rogers, Malcolm J. 1966. Ancient Hunters of the Far West. Union-Tribune Publishing, San Diego.
Seymour, Gregory R. 1997. A Reevaluation of Lower Colorado Buff Ware Ceramics: Redefining the Patayan in Southern Nevada. Unpublished Master thesis, University of Nevada, Las Vegas.
Schaefer, Jerry. 2013. "Malcolm Rogers' Arizona Fieldwork, 1926-1936". Pacific Coast Archaeological Society Quarterly 48(3&4):30-42. 
Schneider, Joan S. 2013. "Malcolm J. Rogers in the Mojave and Colorado Deserts". Pacific Coast Archaeological Society Quarterly 48(3&4):13-20.
Schroeder, Albert H. 1958. "Lower Colorado Buff Ware: A Descriptive Revision". In Pottery Types of the Southwest, edited by Harold S. Colton. Museum of Northern Arizona Ceramic Series No. 3D. Flagstaff.
Sutton, Mark Q. 2013. The Development of Cultural Sequences in the Mojave Desert: The Contributions of Malcolm J. Rogers. Pacific Coast Archaeological Society Quarterly 48(3&4):57-64.
Van Camp, Gena R. 1979. Kumeyaay Pottery: Paddle-and-Anvil Techniques of Southern California. Ballena Press, Socorro, New Mexico.
Warren, Claude N. 1966. The San Dieguito Type Site: M. J. Rogers' 1938 Excavation on the San Dieguito River. San Diego Museum Papers No. 5.
Warren, Claude N. 2013. "Malcolm J. Rogers' 1938 Excavation Techniques at the C. W. Harris Site (CA-SDI-149)". Pacific Coast Archaeological Society Quarterly 48(3&4):21-30.
Waters, Michael R. 1982a. "The Lowland Patayan Ceramic Tradition". In Hohokam and Patayan: Prehistory of Southwestern Arizona, edited by Randall H. McGuire and Michael B. Schiffer, pp. 175–297. Academic Press, New York.
Waters, Michael R. 1982b. "The Lowland Patayan Ceramic Typology". In Hohokam and Patayan: Prehistory of Southwestern Arizona, edited by Randall H. McGuire and Michael B. Schiffer, pp. 537–570. Academic Press, New York.

1890 births
1960 deaths
Archaeologists of California
Archaeologists of the Baja California peninsula
People from Escondido, California
People from Fulton, Oswego County, New York
20th-century American archaeologists
20th-century American anthropologists
Historians from New York (state)
Historians from California